In database systems, durability is the ACID property which guarantees that transactions that have committed will survive permanently. 
For example, if a flight booking reports that a seat has successfully been booked, then the seat will remain booked even if the system crashes.

Durability can be achieved by flushing the transaction's log records to non-volatile storage before acknowledging commitment.

In distributed transactions, all participating servers must coordinate before commit can be acknowledged. This is usually done by a two-phase commit protocol.

Many DBMSs implement durability by writing transactions into a transaction log that can be reprocessed to recreate the system state right before any later failure. A transaction is deemed committed only after it is entered in the log.

See also
 Atomicity
 Consistency
 Isolation
 Relational database management system

References

Data management
Transaction processing